The 1977 Buffalo Bills season was the franchise's 18th season, and their eighth in the National Football League. The team posted a losing record for the second-consecutive season, and missed the postseason for the third season.

Buffalo started the season with four consecutive losses, and failed to win consecutive games. The team was shut out two times at home. The Bills beat only one team with a winning record — the New England Patriots in an early November game in Foxboro that ultimately proved fatal to the Patriots' playoff hopes.

After drawing 76,000 to Rich Stadium on opening day against the Dolphins, Buffalo drew an average of only 35,000 for the remaining six home games.

The Bills had one of the most pass-heavy offenses in the NFL in 1977. Quarterback Joe Ferguson led the league in pass attempts (457, 32.6 per game) and passing yards (2,803, 200.2 per game). He also threw 24 interceptions, the most in the NFL.

Although the Bills passed the ball more often than any other team, they were not efficient through the air: they ranked 19th out of 28 teams in passing touchdowns, 21st in yards per attempt, and 20th in quarterback rating (a dismal 54.7). Buffalo's 160 points scored was the third-worst in the NFL.

Buffalo’s defense also gave up 313 points, the fourth-worst total in the league. Buffalo's anemic scoring and porous defense gave the team a point-differential of −153, dead-last in the league. This was the last season for O.J. Simpson as a member of the Bills, as he was traded to the 49ers the following season. Simpson would ultimately finish his last season with the Bills with 557 rushing yards on 126 attempts.

Offseason

NFL draft 

Seventh round pick Mike Nelms was cut by the Bills in the 1977 training camp, and went to play in the Canadian Football League for the next three seasons. He returned to the NFL in 1980, joining the Washington Redskins, and was voted to three consecutive NFC Pro Bowl squads from 1980–1982.

Cornerback Charles Romes played in every game for the Bills from 1977 until his final season with Buffalo in 1986. He finished his career in Buffalo with 28 interceptions, fourth in Bills’ history.

Personnel

Staff/coaches

Roster

Schedule 

Note: Intra-division opponents are in bold text.

Season summary

Week 5

Week 11

Week 12

Week 13 

 Source: Pro-Football-Reference.com

Standings

Awards and honors

All-Pros 

 Joe DeLamielleure, Guard

Notes

References

External links 
 Pro-Football-Reference.com: 1977 Buffalo Bills

Video Archives 
 1977 NFL Week 12: Redskins at Bills at YouTube
 1977 NFL Week 13: Bills at Jets at YouTube

Buffalo Bills seasons
Buffalo Bills
Buffalo